Imperialibacter roseus is a Gram-negative and aerobic bacterium from the genus of Imperialibacter which has been isolated from groundwater.

References

External links
Type strain of Imperialibacter roseus at BacDive -  the Bacterial Diversity Metadatabase

Sphingobacteriia
Bacteria described in 2013